A characteristic of Homer's style is the use of epithets, as in "rosy-fingered" Dawn or "swift-footed" Achilles. Epithets are used because of the constraints of the dactylic hexameter (i.e., it is convenient to have a stockpile of metrically fitting phrases to add to a name) and because of the oral transmission of the poems; they are mnemonic aids to the singer and the audience alike.

Formulae in epic poetry from various Indo-European traditions may be traced to a common tradition.  For example, the phrase for "everlasting glory" or "undying fame" can be found in the Homeric Greek as  /  and Vedic Sanskrit as  / .  These two phrases were, in terms of historical linguistics, equivalent in phonology, accentuation, and quantity (syllable length). In other words, they descend from a fragment of poetic diction (reconstructable as Proto-Indo-European ) which was handed down in parallel over many centuries, in continually diverging forms, by generations of singers whose ultimate ancestors shared an archetypal repertoire of poetic formulae and narrative themes.

In contrast to the more general term 'epithet', which is used in poetic contexts, for the ancient Greek religion, the epiclesis ( (literally 'calling upon')) was used as the surname that was associated with a deity during religious invocations.

Epithets alter the meaning of each noun to which they are attached.  They specify the existential nature of a noun; that is to say, Achilles is not called "swift-footed" only when he runs; it is a marker of a quality that does not change.  Special epithets, such as patronymics, are used exclusively for particular subjects and distinguish them from others, while generic epithets are used of many subjects and speak less to their individual characters.  In these examples, the epithet can be contradictory to the past state of the subject: in Odyssey VI.74, for instance, Nausicaa takes her "radiant clothing", to be washed; since it is dirty, it is unlikely to be radiant.

List

General
men
shining, divine
born from Zeus
god-like
high-hearted 
brilliant
leaders
lord of men
women
white-armed
lovely-haired
ox eyed
goddesses
of the golden distaff with 
day
the day of return (— nostalgia also comes from )
sea
loud-roaring
grey 
wine-colored
lions
eating raw flesh
mountain-bred
fiery

Nations
Albanes
swift
sporting long hair
Achaeans
hairy-headed
bronzed-armored
strong-greaved
glancing-eyed
with hollow ships
Trojans
tamers of horses

Individuals
Achilles
son of Peleus
swift-footed
breaking through men
lion-hearted
like to the gods
shepherd of the people
Aeneas
Son of Anchises
Counselor of the Trojans
Lord of the Trojans
Great-hearted
King of men
Great
Agamemnon
son of Atreus ( : also transliterated )
wide-ruling lord
the lord marshal
powerful
shepherd of the people
lord of men
brilliant
Aias/Ajax
Son of Telamon
swift
gigantic
the mighty
Andromache
daughter of Eetion
white-armed
Aphrodite
laughter-loving
daughter of Zeus
goddess of love
fair
Apollo
Phoebus, i.e. the Bright or Pure,
with unshorn hair; i.e., ever-young
destroyer of mice
distant deadly Archer
far-aiming lord
rouser of armies
son of Zeus
of the silver bow
famous with the bow
whom the sleek-haired Leto has born
Ares
slayer of men
sacker of cities
bronzen
furious
destroyer of city walls
of the glinting helmet
women raping
Athena
Pallas
gray-, bright-eyed
daughter of Zeus
third-born of the gods
whose shield is thunder
hope of soldiers
tireless one
Ariadne
lovely-haired
Artemis
the archer-goddess
shooter of arrows
Briseis
fair-cheeked
fair-haired
Calypso
beautiful nymph
softly-braided nymph
divine
goddess most divinely made
daughter of Atlas
cunning goddess
Chryseis
beautiful-cheeked
Circe
enchantress
Cronus (Kronos)
crooked-counselling, devious-devising
all-powerful
Demeter
fair-haired
Diomedes
son of Tydeus
great spearman
master of the war cry
god-like
strong
breaker of horses
Hector
tall
shepherd of the people
of the glinting helmet, of the shining helm
man-killing
horse-taming
Helen
long-dressed
daughter of a noble house
Daughter of Zeus who holds the aegis
Hera
ox-eyed lady
Hephaestus
the famous craftsman
the famous lame god
of the strong arms
Hermes
messenger of the gods and conductor of men
slayer of Argos
son of Zeus
giant-killer
the strong one
keen eyes emissary
Ino
lovely-ankled
Iris
wind-footed
Menelaus
red-haired, fair-haired, flaming-haired
master of the war-cry
son of Atreus
war-like
spear-famed
loved by Ares
cherished by Zeus
Naubolos
great-hearted
Nestor
Godly Nestor
Gerenian charioteer
son of Neleus
Pylos born king
sweet spoken
wise old
Odysseus
resourceful, man of many resources, of many turns, man of twists and turns
much-enduring
great-hearted
sacker of cities
wise
loved of Zeus
great glory of the Achaeans
master mariner
mastermind of war
hotheaded
man of action
the great teller of tales
man of exploits
man of pain
that kingly man
the hero
Raider of Cities
the great tactician
cunning
Onchestos
sacred
Pandaros
son of Lykaon
Patroclus
son of Menoitius
Zeus-born, sprung from Zeus
dear to Zeus
great-hearted
horseman ( or )
peerless
peer to gods in counsel
gentle
hero
Paris
Alexandros
magnificent
Penelope
cautious, careful, circumspect, discreet, wise, self-obsessed
Poseidon
Earth-shaker (  or  )
earth-moving, earth-carrying
Sarpedon
leader of the Lycians
Suitors
swaggering
haughty
Telemachus
poised
thoughtful
Thetis
silver-footed
Thersites
of the endless speech
Tydeus
driver of horses
Zeus
mighty
son of Kronos
wide-seeing
cloud-gatherer
father of gods and men
of the dazzling bolt
loud-thundering
delighting in thunder
aegis-holding
who marshals the thunderheads

Shared
Paris, Hector, Polites
son of Priam
Antilochus, Pisistratus
son of Nestor
Hector, Agamemnon, Atreus, Diomedes, Nestor
breaker of horses, horse-tamer
Agamemnon, Achilles, Diomedes
best of the Achaeans
Hector, Ares
manslaughtering

See also
List of kennings – kennings in Icelandic, Old Norse, and Old English
Makurakotoba – epithets in classical Japanese

Notes

Sources
 Parry, Milman. "L'Épithète traditionnelle dans Homère: Essai sur un problème de style homérique." Paris: Société d'Éditions "Les Belles Lettres", 1928.
 Parry, Milman, ed. Adam Parry. "The Making of Homeric Verse: The Collected Papers of Milman Parry." Oxford: The Clarendon PRess, 1971.
 Edwards, Mark. "Homer and the Oral Tradition: The Formula (part one)." Oral Tradition 1 (1986) 171-230.
 Edwards, Mark. "Homer and the Oral Tradition: The Formula (part two)." Oral Tradition 3 (1988) 11-60.
 Reece, Steve. "Greek Epic Formulae," in Giorgios Giannakis (ed.), Encyclopedia of Ancient Greek Language and Linguistics (Leiden: Brill, 2014) 613-615. Greek_Epic_Formulas
 Reece, Steve. "Epithets," in Margalit Finkelberg (ed.), Homeric Encyclopedia (Oxford: Blackwell, 2011) 257-259. Epithets
 V.J. Howe, "Epithets in Homer."  Available online at http://www.angelfire.com/art/archictecture/articles/008.htm. (Retrieved October 16, 2007.)
 Fagles, Robert. "The Odyssey." Penguin Books, 1996.

Homeric Greek
Homer